John S. Buttles (January 20, 1877 – May 18, 1949) was an American attorney and judge. He served as an associate justice of the Vermont Supreme Court from 1937 to 1949.

Early life
John Stephen Buttles was born in Troy, New York on January 20, 1877, the son of Hiram S. and Sybil G. (Selleck) Buttles.  He was raised in Brandon, Vermont, and graduated from Brandon High School in 1893.  He received a Ph.B. degree from the University of Vermont in 1897, and was a member of Kappa Sigma and Phi Beta Kappa.  He taught school in Rutland, Massachusetts, and then began attendance at New York Law School, from which he received an LL.B. degree in 1900.  Battles was admitted to the bar, and worked as an attorney for the New York Life Insurance Company in New York City, Dubuque, Iowa, and Chicago until returning to Vermont in 1905.

Continued career
Buttles settled first in Rutland, and later in Brandon, and became a partner in the law practice of Ebenezer J. Ormsbee.  A Republican, he served in several local offices, including assistant judge of Rutland's city court, and Brandon's town meeting moderator and grand juror (city court prosecutor).  In 1916, he was an unsuccessful candidate for the Republican nomination for State's Attorney of Rutland County.

During World War I, Buttles served in Company C, 1st Regiment of the Vermont Volunteer Militia, the organization formed to perform home guard duties while soldiers of the Vermont National Guard were activated for overseas duty.  Commissioned as a first lieutenant in 1917, he was promoted to captain and company commander in December 1918.

In 1918, Buttles was elected to the Vermont House of Representatives.  He was serving in the House in April 1919, when he was appointed Vermont's Commissioner of Industries.  He served as commissioner until 1926, when he was appointed to the bench.

Judicial career
In November 1926, Buttles resigned as Commissioner of Industries in order to accept appointment as a judge of the Vermont Superior Court.  He served until 1937, and advanced through seniority to become the court's chief judge.

In January 1937, Buttles was appointed as an associate justice of the Vermont Supreme Court, replacing Frank D. Thompson, who had retired.  He served on the court until retiring in January 1949, and was succeeded by Charles Bayley Adams.

Death and burial
Buttles died at the hospital in Rutland on May 19, 1949.  He was buried at Pine Hill Cemetery in Brandon.

Family
On May 28, 1901, Buttles married Marilla J. Whitcomb (1878-1911).  In 1914, Buttles married Marion E. Seager (1875-1951).  With his first wife, Buttles was the father of a son, Robert S. Buttles (1904-1982).

References

Sources

Newspapers

Books

Magazines

Internet

External links

1877 births
1949 deaths
People from Brandon, Vermont
People from Rutland, Massachusetts
University of Vermont alumni
New York Law School alumni
Vermont lawyers
Republican Party members of the Vermont House of Representatives
Justices of the Vermont Supreme Court
Burials in Vermont